Lucinda Russell  (born 24 June 1966) is a Scottish horse trainer. She trained 2017 Grand National winner One For Arthur. She is the partner of the former National Hunt jockey Peter Scudamore. Russell was appointed Officer of the Order of the British Empire in the 2018 Birthday Honours.

Major wins
 Great Britain
 Mildmay Novices' Chase - (1) - Ahoy Senor (2022)
 Sefton Novices' Hurdle - (1) - Ahoy Senor (2021)
 Albert Bartlett Novices' Hurdle - (1) - Brindisi Breeze (2012)

References

External links

1966 births
Living people
British racehorse trainers
Officers of the Order of the British Empire